Macelognathus is an extinct genus of sphenosuchian crocodylomorph from the Late Jurassic. Originally it was believed be a turtle and later a dinosaur. It lived in what is now Wyoming, in North America.
 
The type species, Macelognathus vagans, was described by Othniel Charles Marsh in 1884 as a turtle based on a partial jaw from the Late Jurassic Morrison Formation at Como Bluff, Wyoming. After being referred to the Dinosauria by Moodie in 1908, it was later reclassified by Ostrom in 1971 as a crocodilian relative. Based on new material from the Morrison Formation at Fruita, Colorado, in 2005 Göhlich et al. identified it as a basal crocodylomorph ("sphenosuchian"). It is considered an example of convergent evolution, due to the similarities to caenagnathid dinosaurs, with which it was not closely related.

It is possibly a junior synonym of Hallopus victor.

References

Late Jurassic crocodylomorphs
Terrestrial crocodylomorphs
Morrison fauna
Late Jurassic crocodylomorphs of North America
Fossil taxa described in 1884
Taxa named by Othniel Charles Marsh
Prehistoric pseudosuchian genera